Bhattakufer is a small village in Shimla District of Himachal Pradesh, India.

Geography 
Bhattakufer is located at 31.093, 77.207. It has an average elevation of 197 hectares. It is situated on National Highway NH22 by pass road, 7 km away from Shimla. As per the 2001 census, the village had the population of 765, with 421 males and 344 females.

References

Villages in Shimla district